Willem Frederik "Wim" Duisenberg (9 July 1935 – 31 July 2005) was a Dutch politician and economist who served as President of the European Central Bank from 1 June 1998 until 31 October 2003. He was a member of the Labour Party (PvdA).

Duisenberg studied Economics at the University of Groningen obtaining a Master of Economics degree and worked as a researcher at his alma mater before finishing his thesis and graduated as a Doctor of Philosophy in Development economics. Duisenberg worked as a financial analyst for the International Monetary Fund (IMF) from January 1966 until March 1969 and as an economist for the Dutch central bank (DNB) from March 1969 until February 1970. Duisenberg worked as a professor of Macroeconomics at the University of Amsterdam from February 1970 until May 1973. After the election of 1972 Duisenberg was appointed as Minister of Finance in the Cabinet Den Uyl taking office on 11 May 1973. The Cabinet Den Uyl fell just before the end of its term. After the election of 1977 Duisenberg was elected as a Member of the House of Representatives serving from 8 June 1977 until 8 September 1977 and again from 16 January 1978 and served as a frontbencher and spokesperson for Finances. In June 1978 Duisenberg unexpectedly announced his retirement and resigned from the House of Representatives on 28 June 1978. Duisenberg semi-retired from active politics at just 42 and became active in the private sector as a corporate director, and worked as a banker for the Rabobank. In November 1981 Duisenberg was nominated as the next President of the Central Bank taking office on 1 January 1982. In June 1997 Duisenberg was nominated as the next President of the European Monetary Institute (EMI), taking office on 1 July 1997. In May 1998 the EMI was reformed to the European Central Bank (ECB) with Duisenberg appointed as the first President of the European Central Bank serving from 1 June 1998 until 31 October 2003.

Duisenberg retired from active politics a second time at 68 and became active again in the private and public sectors as a corporate and non-profit director and served on several state commissions and councils on behalf of the government. Following his retirement Duisenberg continued to be active as an advocate and lobbyist for balanced governmental budgets, financial regulation and more European integration. Duisenberg was known for his abilities as a skillful manager and effective negotiator and continued to comment on political affairs until his death after suffering a heart attack and drowning in a swimming pool in July 2005 at the age of 70.

Early life and education
Willem Frederik Duisenberg was born on 9 July 1935 in the Frisian city of Heerenveen in the Netherlands. He was the son of Lammert Duisenberg, who was a waterworks supervisor, and Antje Ykema. He went to a public primary school in his hometown. He went to secondary school, first one year of Hogere Burgerschool and then gymnasium with natural sciences, also in Heerenveen. In 1954, Duisenberg moved to Haren. He studied at the University of Groningen in Groningen from 1954 to 1961, where he received his doctorandus degree (equivalent of Master of Science) cum laude in economics, majoring in international relations. He was a member of Groninger Studentencorps Vindicat atque Polit. In 1959, he became a member of the Labour Party. In 1960, he married Tine Stelling. In 1965, he obtained his doctor degree (equivalent of Doctor of Philosophy) with his thesis De economische gevolgen van de ontwapening (The economic consequences of the disarmament) under the supervision of professor F. J. de Jong.

Politics

Duisenberg subsequently worked for the International Monetary Fund in Washington, D.C. for years followed by a year as an advisor to the director of the Nederlandsche Bank, the Dutch central bank in Amsterdam. He was then appointed a professor at the University of Amsterdam where he taught macroeconomics. From 1973 to 1977, Duisenberg was Minister of Finance under Prime Minister Joop den Uyl. Shortly afterwards, he gave up his seat in Parliament to become vice president of Rabobank, a Dutch bank. Two years later, he was appointed director of the Nederlandsche Bank, serving as its president from 1982 to 1997. His tenure at the Dutch central bank was marked by caution and reserve. Under his direction, the Dutch guilder was linked to the German Deutsche Mark; this benefited the Dutch economy, owing to the strength of the German currency. He also followed German central bank's interest rate policies closely, which earned him the nickname "Mr. Fifteen Minutes" because he quickly followed any interest rate changes made by the Deutsche Bundesbank.

First president of the European Central Bank

Owing to the success of his monetary policy, he became well known in other European countries, and this led to his appointment in 1998 as the first president of the new European Central Bank in Frankfurt, much to the chagrin of France, who wanted a French candidate. A compromise was agreed upon (although publicly denied by all parties) whereby Duisenberg would serve for at least four years, upon which the Frenchman Jean-Claude Trichet, director of the Banque de France, would take over. In 1999, Duisenberg received the Vision for Europe Award in recognition of his efforts toward the unification of Europe.

During his tenure at the bank, Duisenberg was known for his cautious monetary policy and for defending the euro through its early years. He sometimes frustrated investors and politicians by sticking to the bank's inflation-fighting stance, keeping rates higher than some would have liked. "I hear, but I don't listen" to such pleas, was one of his typically blunt responses. Duisenberg repeatedly said it was up to European governments to pursue structural changes such as loosening rigid rules on hiring and firing personnel if they wanted more growth. Duisenberg announced he would retire on 9 July 2003 (his 69th birthday), but he remained in office until Trichet was cleared of charges of fraud in connection with the collapse of the French bank Crédit Lyonnais. Trichet took over presidency of the ECB on 1 November 2003.

Death
Duisenberg died in 2005 at the age of 70 while on vacation at his villa in Faucon near Orange, France. He drowned in his swimming pool after suffering a heart attack. A commemoration service was held on 6 August 2005 in the Amsterdam Concertgebouw. Duisenberg was buried later that day in the Zorgvlied cemetery in Amsterdam.

Decorations
 Order of the Netherlands Lion (Netherlands)
 Knight (11 April 1978)
 Commander (17 June 1997)
 Commander of the Order of Orange-Nassau (Netherlands)
 Knight Grand Cross of the Order of Isabella the Catholic
 Honorary doctorate in Economics from the University of Amsterdam (8 January 2001)

References

External links

|-

|-

|-

|-

|-

1935 births
2005 deaths
Commanders of the Order of Orange-Nassau
Commanders of the Order of the Netherlands Lion
Deaths by drowning in France
Dutch development economists
Dutch bankers
Dutch business theorists
Dutch business writers
Dutch chief executives in the finance industry
Dutch corporate directors
Dutch expatriates in Germany
Dutch expatriates in the United States
Dutch financial advisors
Dutch financial analysts
Dutch financial writers
Dutch officials of the European Union
Financial economists
Financial planners
Grand Crosses 1st class of the Order of Merit of the Federal Republic of Germany
International economists
Labour Party (Netherlands) politicians
Macroeconomists
Members of the House of Representatives (Netherlands)
Members of the Social and Economic Council
Members of the Steering Committee of the Bilderberg Group
Ministers of Finance of the Netherlands
Monetarists
Monetary economists
People from Heerenveen
Presidents of the Central Bank of the Netherlands
Presidents of the European Central Bank
Academic staff of the University of Amsterdam
University of Groningen alumni
Academic staff of the University of Groningen
20th-century Dutch businesspeople
20th-century Dutch civil servants
20th-century Dutch economists
20th-century Dutch educators
20th-century Dutch male writers
20th-century Dutch politicians
21st-century Dutch politicians